Rositsa Spasova (born 28 November 1954) is a Bulgarian rower. She competed at the 1976 Summer Olympics and the 1980 Summer Olympics.

References

External links
 

1954 births
Living people
Bulgarian female rowers
Olympic rowers of Bulgaria
Rowers at the 1976 Summer Olympics
Rowers at the 1980 Summer Olympics
Place of birth missing (living people)
World Rowing Championships medalists for Bulgaria